December Bride is a 1954–1959 American television sitcom.

December Bride may also refer to:

 December Bride (radio program), a 1952–1953 radio sitcom adapted for the TV series
 December Bride (film), a 1990 Irish drama film
 "December Bride" (Roseanne), a 1995 television episode